M77 or M-77 may refer to:

 M-77 (Michigan highway), a state highway in Michigan
 M77 motorway, a motorway in Scotland
 M-77 pistol, a semi-automatic pistol
 Miles M.77 Sparrowjet, a 1950 twin-engined jet-powered racing aeroplane 
 Zastava M77, a Serbian assault rifle 
 Ruger M77, a bolt-action rifle
 Messier 77, a spiral galaxy in the constellation Cetus
 M-77 Oganj, a Serbian multiple rocket launcher
 Dual-Purpose Improved Conventional Munition, M77 DPICM submunition